George W. Ashburn (1814 – March 30, 1868) was a Radical Republican US Senate candidate and judge assassinated by the Ku Klux Klan in Columbus, Georgia for his pro-African-American actions. He was the first murder victim of the Klan in the state.

Early life
Ashburn was born in North Carolina in 1814. He moved to Georgia around 1830. He opposed the Secession of Georgia. During the American Civil War, he was commissioned a Colonel in the Union army. 

After President Abraham Lincoln was assassinated in April 1865, Ashburn wrote a letter to Andrew Johnson stating "the hand of God is in the assassination" on the grounds that Lincoln was not properly prepared to punish ex-Confederates for their deeds. He married Georgia Ryley in 1843. They had one daughter.

Postwar
At the end of the war, Ashburn returned to Columbus, Georgia and was appointed a judge by the military Governor, George G. Meade. In this capacity he worked to remove the political disabilities of all disenfranchised Georgians. Ashburn called to order the Georgia Constitutional Convention of 1867, held in Atlanta, which also aimed at removing the obstructions placed on African Americans rights after the end of slavery. Ashburn was the author of the provisions in the new Constitution that assured civil rights to blacks. At the Convention, Ashburn suggested that the new Constitution should be implemented even if the people of Georgia don't concur.

Considered a scalawag by his white Columbus neighbors, he worked with the Freedmens Bureau and alongside African American leaders such as Henry McNeal Turner. His actions quickly created several enemies across the South. Ashburn lived amongst the African American population and garnered attention from the Ku Klux Klan, which established their Columbus chapter on March 21, 1868 after a visit from Nathan Bedford Forrest.

Assassination
"In 1868, Ashburn assembled an organization to support his election to the U.S. Senate after Georgia has been readmitted to the Union." On the night of March 30, 1868, Ashburn participated at a huge gathering of blacks and Republicans at Temperance Hall in Columbus, Georgia. One of the featured speakers was Henry McNeal Turner. Just after midnight, Ashburn was murdered at a house on the corner of 13th Avenue and 2st Street by a group of five well-dressed men wearing masks.

Political exoneration
During the time of Ashburn’s murder, Georgia was still under the military governorship of General George Meade (the victor of Gettysburg), of the Third Military District. As soon as he heard of the murder, Meade implemented martial law in Columbus, removing the mayor from office, and ordering the immediate arrest of all suspects. The trial, beginning on June 29, gained national attention as over twenty persons were arrested and held at Fort McPherson. The prisoners consisted mostly of prominent white residents of Columbus. General Henry L. Benning and former Confederate Vice President Alexander Stephens agreed to represent the accused.

The Federal government was pushing for Georgia to ratify the Fourteenth Amendment, while the Georgia legislature was resisting it. The defenders of the Klan saw an opportunity for a bargain. On July 21, as the trial progressed, Georgia agreed to ratify the 14th Amendment in exchange for General Meade's termination of the prosecution of the murderers. All prisoners made bail and returned to Columbus. No one was ever prosecuted.

National attention
Newspapers across the United States covered the assassination and subsequent trial. The pro-Klan forces in the South capitalized upon the events, publishing a full-length book on the trial titled Radical Rule: Military Outrage in Georgia.

See also
Reconstruction Era
Battle of Columbus (1865)
Carpetbagger

References

External links 
Radical Rule: Military Outrage In Georgia. Arrest Of Columbus Prisoners: With Facts Connected With Their Imprisonment And Release, Printed By John P. Morton and Company, 150 Main Street, Louisville, KY: 1868.]
George W. Ashburn murder
"The Ashburn Murder Case," Georgia Historical Quarterly.
Telfair, Nancy. A History of Columbus, Georgia, 1828-1928 (Columbus, Georgia, centenary). Higginson Book Company (1998), 155.
Radical Rule: Ashburn murder trial
Carpetbaggers and Scalawags: Georgia Encyclopedia  
Georgia Constitutional Convention of 1867

1814 births
1868 deaths
People from Columbus, Georgia
Union Army colonels
Slavery in the United States
Assassinated American politicians
Assassinated American civil rights activists
People murdered in Georgia (U.S. state)
Deaths by firearm in Georgia (U.S. state)
Southern Unionists in the American Civil War
Victims of the Ku Klux Klan
Assassinated American judges
Assassinated United States Senate candidates